Building performance is an attribute of a building that expresses how well that building carries out its functions. It may also relate to the performance of the building construction process. Categories of building performance are quality (how well the building fulfils its functions), resource saving (how much resource is needed to fulfil its functions) and workload capacity (how much the building can do). The performance of a building depends on the response of the building to an external load or shock. Building performance plays an important role in architecture, building services engineering, building regulation, architectural engineering and construction management. Prominent building performance aspects are energy efficiency, thermal comfort, indoor air quality and daylighting.

Background

Building performance has been of interest to humans from the very first shelters built to protect us from the weather, natural enemies and other dangers. Initially design and performance were managed by craftsmen who combined expertise in both domains. More formal approaches to building performance appeared in the 1970s and 1980s, with seminal works being the book on Building Performance and CIB Report 64. Further progress on building performance studies took place in parallel with the development of building science as a discipline, and with the introduction of personal computing (especially computer simulation) in the field; for a good overview of the role of simulation in building design see the chapter by Augenbroe. A more general overview that also includes physical measurement, expert judgement and stakeholder evaluation is presented in the book Building Performance Analysis. While energy efficiency, thermal comfort, indoor air quality and (day)lighting are very prominent in the debate on building performance, there is much longer list of building performance aspect that includes things like resistance against burglary, flexibility for change of use, and many others; for an overview see the building performance analysis platform website in the external links below.

ASHRAE Performance Measurement Protocols 
Although many buildings in the U.S., Canada, U.K., and elsewhere claim to be “green,” “low energy,” or “high performance,” it is rarely clear on what evidence or data these claims are based. Such claims cannot be credible without standardized performance measurement protocols that are applied consistently. If claims of superior building performance are to be believed, it is essential that a common set of measurements be used and the results reported against meaningful benchmarks. Such protocols are also needed to give usable feedback to building designers and operators when measured performance does not match design intent.
This article describes ASHRAE’s Performance Measurement Protocols for Commercial Buildings (PMP), which provides a standardized, consistent set of protocols, for a range of cost/accuracy, to facilitate the appropriate comparison of measured energy, water, and indoor environmental quality (thermal comfort, indoor air quality [IAQ], lighting, and acoustics) performance of commercial buildings, while maintaining acceptable levels of building service for the occupants. Benchmarks are included in the protocols to facilitate comparison to peer buildings or for self-reference over time (often before and after retrofit). A recent article describing just the acoustic performance measurement protocols in the PMP has been published in the ASHRAE Journal. 
The PMP is a collaborative effort of ASHRAE, the U.S. Green Building Council (USGBC), and the Chartered Institution of Building Service Engineers (CIBSE). It began with a detailed evaluation of literature related to measured building performance that included databases, measurement techniques, M&V protocols, and available instrumentation. A project committee representing several ASHRAE Technical Committees (TCs 7.6, 7.9, 4.7, and others) developed the content.

The protocols identify what to measure, how it is to be measured (instrumentation and spatial resolution), and how often it is to be measured for inclusion in the building’s operation and maintenance plan. For each of the six measure categories (energy, water, thermal comfort, IAQ, lighting, and acoustics), protocols are developed at three levels: low, medium and high cost and accuracy, providing a range of choices for levels of effort, detail, and rigor to characterize the building stock, and comparison to appropriate benchmarks.

For each measure category and each level, the following characteristics are described: 
 Objectives of the measurement. 
 Metrics to be used, including instrumentation and units of measure.  
 Performance evaluation and benchmarks. Estimates of initial and recurring costs are included. 
In the PMP, first the six measure categories are addressed at the basic level. This is followed by a presentation of the intermediate level protocols and then the advanced level protocols. However, here we will primarily discuss the basic level protocols, with only a brief description of higher levels; details of the intermediate and advanced levels are described in the PMP.

Representative measures at each level were tested by applying them to the newly renovated ASHRAE Headquarters Building in Atlanta (facing page). Measurements were taken by the commissioning authority for the renovation during 2009 and 2010, after the renovated building was reoccupied and was undergoing post-occupancy commissioning. Occupant surveys were taken before and after the renovation to evaluate indoor environmental quality.

See also
 Building energy simulation
 Ecological design
 Energy audit
 Environmental impact assessment
 Green retrofit
 Sociology of architecture
 Sustainable architecture
 Sustainable design
 Weatherization

References

External links 
ASHRAE - measuring commercial building performance  
 Global Buildings Performance Network
 BPI Building Performance Institute - U.S. organization setting home performance technical standards
 Building Performance Association  - U.S. trade association of home performance contractors and others promoting performance based energy retrofits.
 Building Performance Journal - Home performance articles.
Platform for discussion of theory on building performance - Building Performance Analysis book companion website

Building engineering
Energy conservation